Mix Run is an unincorporated village located in Gibson Township, Cameron County, Pennsylvania, United States. The village is not tracked by the U.S. Census Bureau.

Geography
The village is somewhat remote and is located adjacent to Elk State Forest.

Personalities
The village is most famous as the birthplace and childhood home of silent film actor Tom Mix (1880–1940).

References

Unincorporated communities in Cameron County, Pennsylvania
Unincorporated communities in Pennsylvania